This is a list of seasons played by Aston Villa Football Club in English and European football, from 1879 (the year of the club's first FA Cup entry) to the most recent completed season. Aston Villa football club was founded in March, 1874, by members of the Villa Cross Wesleyan Chapel in Aston. Throughout the 1870s Aston Villa played a small number of games. At least one game, against Aston Brook St Mary's was played with one half under Rugby rules and the other under football rules. In the 1880s the game became more formalised and in 1888, William McGregor formed the Football League with eleven other clubs.

The club has won the League Championship seven times, the FA Cup seven times, the EFL Cup five times, the Charity Shield once (shared), the European Cup once, the European Super Cup once and the Intertoto Cup twice.

This list details the club's achievements in all major competitions, and the top scorers for each season. Top scorers in bold were also the top scorers in the English league that season. Records of competitions such as the Birmingham Senior Cup are not included due to them being considered of less importance than the FA Cup and the EFL Cup.

Seasons

Key

Pld – Matches played
W – Matches won
D – Matches drawn
L – Matches lost
GF – Goals for
GA – Goals against
Pts – Points
Pos – Final position

FL – Football League
Div 1 – Football League First Division
Div 2 – Football League Second Division
Div 3 – Football League Third Division
Champ – EFL Championship
Prem – Premier League
N/A – Not applicable
Divisions in bold indicate a change in division.

PO – Play-off round
R1 – Round 1
R2 – Round 2
R3 – Round 3
R4 – Round 4
R5 – Round 5
R32 – Round of 32
R16 – Round of 16
QF – Quarter-finals
SF – Semi-finals
RU – Runners-up
W – Winners

Notes

References
Specific

General

 

 
 
 

 
 

Seasons
 
Aston Villa F.C.